Schaffer is an unincorporated community in Rush County, Kansas, United States.

History
Schaffer had a post office between 1892 and 1948.

Education
The community is served by Otis–Bison USD 403 public school district.

References

Further reading

External links
 Rush County maps: Current, Historic, KDOT

Unincorporated communities in Rush County, Kansas
Unincorporated communities in Kansas